Zanoterone (former developmental code name WIN-49596), also known as (5α,17α)-1'-(methylsulfonyl)-1'-H-pregn-20-yno[3,2-c]pyrazol-17-ol, is a steroidal antiandrogen which was never marketed. It was investigated for the treatment of benign prostatic hyperplasia (BPH) but failed to demonstrate sufficient efficacy in phase II clinical trials, and also showed an unacceptable incidence rate and severity of side effects (e.g., breast pain and gynecomastia). As such, it was not further developed.

Zanoterone was derived from 5α-dihydroethisterone (5α-dihydro-17α-ethynyltestosterone). It is an antagonist of the androgen receptor (Ki = 2.2 μM;  compared to metribolone = 2.2%), and with the exception of antiprogestogenic activity in rat and rabbit models, is devoid of other hormonal activities. Zanoterone does not inhibit 5α-reductase, aromatase, or 3α- or 3β-hydroxysteroid dehydrogenase in vitro. The drug significantly increases testosterone and estradiol levels in men. Zanoterone has been found to not significantly inhibit mating performance or fertility in adult male rats at high dosages for an extended period of time. It has been found to act as an inducer of the enzyme CYP3A4 in vivo in rats.

See also
 List of steroidal antiandrogens

References

Abandoned drugs
Androstanes
Antiprogestogens
Progonadotropins
Pyrazoles
Steroidal antiandrogens
Sulfonamides